Sitona striatellus is a species of weevil native to Europe.

References

External links
Images representing Sitona  at BOLD

Curculionidae
Beetles described in 1834
Beetles of Europe